Street Fighter Alpha: Generations is a 2005 Japanese anime film produced by A.P.P.P. and released by Manga Entertainment based on the Street Fighter Alpha 2 video games by Capcom. Its production is unrelated to 2000's Street Fighter Alpha: The Animation, which was produced by Group TAC. The film was produced specifically for the English-language market and was not officially released in Japan until its inclusion as a bonus feature in the DVD release of Street Fighter: The Legend of Chun-Li.

Plot
The movie begins with Gouki (as Akuma is called in both the Japanese and English dubs of the movie) battling his master Goutetsu. Though both combatants show equal potency, in the end, Gouki is the victor, killing Goutetsu with the Raging Demon technique.

Gouken arrives in time to find the mangled body of their master Goutetsu and a no longer human-looking Gouki. Gouken scorns Gouki, telling him that his path was set for him and asking why he would do such a thing. Gouki took his master's beaded necklace and walks away completely unfazed. Sayaka, unable to reach the fight in time, falls down to her knees and vomits, a sign of her pregnancy and her connection to Gouki.

The movie then moves forward, introducing Ryu, who is visiting his master's old dojo. It is there that an apparition of Gouki comes to Ryu and challenges him. When Ryu comes to his senses, he is greeted by an old man, who says that he, too, had just witnessed what was a true demon. The old man invites Ryu to his house, where Ryu meets his granddaughter Fuka, and offers to train him. Sakura shows up and spars with him, which encourages Ryu to accept Gouki's challenge.

Ryu seeks out Akuma, and the fight begins. During their hard battle Ken confronts the old man and is easily taken down. It is here that old man tells Ken about the Satsui no Hadou. He states that the Satsui no Hadou is a mysterious evil life force that dwells within certain fighters. As this life force is exploited, it grows stronger until it consumes its possessor. Once the person is consumed by the Satsui no Hadou, they cannot be released from its hold. He states that the Satsui no Hadou is ancient, that even old warlords knew of its existence.

As Ryu and Gouki continue to fight, Ryu becomes desperate and is temporarily possessed by the Satsui no Hadou. However, he realizes that it is not the correct course of action and stops using the power. Gouki scolds Ryu, saying to him that his path to a great warrior had been clouded and that a true warrior unleashes his full potential. Seeing Ryu as no threat to him anymore, Gouki unleashes a Metsu Hadouken on him, only to have Ryu survive it. Gouki then walks away, cursing Gouken and saying that he will meet Ryu again and fight him. Gouki sees an apparition of Sayaka treating his wounds in the past before the scene shifts back to the present with Gouki demonstrating a more human appearance with normal eyes, perhaps implying that he has regained some of his humanity. Bruised from his fight, Ryu walks away, foreshadowing a possible battle in the future.

The movie ends with the old man standing, looking to the sky and addressing an old friend (Gouken). He states that he was asked by Gouken to take care of a young child (Fuka or Ryu) who was left in his care when his mother (Sayaka) died giving birth to the child and was told not to let the child take the path that the father (Gouki) had chosen, but one day, took his eyes off the child for an instant, and it was the biggest mistake he had ever made. He states that he is too old, and that his time has come. Fuka is later seen praying in tears. Ryu takes one last look at her and leaves soon after, beginning his travels again.

Cast

Reception
Street Fighter Alpha: Generations was not as successful as its predecessor, earning a 52% "rotten" score on Rotten Tomatoes.

References

External links
 Street Fighter Alpha: Generations (broken link)
 
 

2005 anime films
Japanese martial arts films
Street Fighter anime and manga
Alpha Generations
Anime films based on video games
2005 martial arts films
2005 films
ja:ストリートファイターZERO#ストリートファイターALPHAジェネレーション